International Institute for Hermeneutics (IIH) is an organization whose purpose is to foster and articulate a general hermeneutics, a task demanding an intensive interdisciplinary collaboration on a level that does not yet exist in the contemporary university. Andrzej Wiercinski is president and founder of the International Institute for Hermeneutics. The Institute publishes Analecta Hermeneutica and International Studies in Hermeneutics and Phenomenology.

See also
North American Nietzsche Society
North American Society for Philosophical Hermeneutics

References

External links
Official website

Continental philosophy organizations
Organizations established in 2001
Hermeneutics